Grace Kaki Awo Ocansey (born March 28, 1991), popularly known as Kaakie, is a Ghanaian dancehall artist. She signed her first record deal with Xtra Large Music. Kaakie grew up as a music lover who listened to various genres of music and did karaoke versions for many of the ones she cherished. At the university, an opportunity came for her to feature in one of the reality shows on TV called “Stars Of The Future”. She was part of the singing competition that run on Ghanaian TV for weeks; but unfortunately, she got evicted along the way (she was rated 5th). From there, she met up with renowned Ghanaian Sound Engineer/Executive Producer, JMJ Baby (Joshua Raphaelson) – Courtesy Charter House – and she got signed to his record label – XTRA LARGE MUSIC.

Education 
Kaakie had her basic education at St. Martin De Porres Basic School in Dansoman, she continued to Achimota School where she was a member of the Scripture Union. Kaakie holds a BSc Midwifery degree from the University of Ghana. She earned her Master's degree from the Anglia Ruskin University in 2019.

Personal life 

Kaakie got married in a traditional ceremony on January 2, 2020.

Awards and nominations

KORA Awards

Ghana Music Awards 

|-
|rowspan="2"|2013
|Herself
|Reggae and Dancehall Artiste of the Year
|
|-
|Herself
|New Artiste of the Year
|
|-
|rowspan="3"|2017
|Herself
|Best Reggae/Dancehall Song of the Year 
|

BASS Awards 

|-
|2013
|Herself
|Best Female Vocalist
|

References 

Living people
1991 births
21st-century Ghanaian women singers
21st-century Ghanaian singers
Alumni of Achimota School
University of Ghana alumni